The 1969 Louth by-election was a by-election held on 4 December 1969 for the British House of Commons constituency of Louth in Lincolnshire.

The seat had become vacant on the death on 31 August of the Conservative Member of Parliament (MP) Sir Cyril Osborne.  He had held the seat since the 1945 general election.

The result was a victory for the Conservative candidate Jeffrey Archer. Archer held the seat until the October 1974 general election, when he stepped down due to financial difficulties and began writing popular novels.

Votes

See also
 Louth constituency
 1920 Louth by-election
 1921 Louth by-election
 List of United Kingdom by-elections

References 

Louth by-election
Louth by-election
By-elections to the Parliament of the United Kingdom in Lincolnshire constituencies
Louth by-election